Elizabeth Lance Toth is professor emeritus at the University of Maryland, College Park known for her work on public relations research.

Education and career 
Toth has a B.A. from Northwestern University and an M.A. and a Ph.D from Purdue University. She worked in public relations from 1969 until 1981, before moving into academia. Toth taught at Southern Methodist University and Southern Illinois University, and was the associate dean of the S. I. Newhouse School of Public Communications at Syracuse University. In 2004 she joined the University of Maryland where she was professor and chair of the Department of Communication. As of 2022, Toth is an emeritus professor at the University of Maryland, College Park. 

Toth was the editor of the Journal of Public Relations Research from 1995 until 2000.

She is known for her work on the role of women and gender in public relations.

Select publications

Awards and honors 
In 2012 she was honored by the University of Alabama's Plank Center. In 2020, the Public Relations Society of America presented Toth with the Sage Award.

References 

Living people
Year of birth missing (living people)
Northwestern University alumni

Purdue University alumni
University System of Maryland faculty
Public relations